Lackey General Merchandise and Warehouse is a historic commercial building at the northeast corner of Arkansas Highway 66 and North Peabody Avenue in the center of Mountain View, Arkansas.  It is a roughly rectangular two-story structure, built out of local stone, with a flat roof surrounded by a low parapet.  Its main facade faces west toward the Stone County Courthouse, with plate glass windows topped by awnings on the first floor, and four sash windows on the second.  The main entrance is in an angle at the street corner, with the building corner supported by a square stone post.  Built in 1924, it is believed to be the largest commercial building in Stone County.

The building was listed on the National Register of Historic Places in 1985.

See also
National Register of Historic Places listings in Stone County, Arkansas

References

Commercial buildings on the National Register of Historic Places in Arkansas
Buildings and structures completed in 1924
Buildings and structures in Mountain View, Arkansas
National Register of Historic Places in Stone County, Arkansas